The 1920 Lehigh Brown and White football team was an American football team that represented Lehigh University as an independent during the 1920 college football season. In its ninth season under head coach Tom Keady, the team compiled a 5–2–2 record and outscored opponents by a total of 172 to 54. The team played its home games at Taylor Stadium in Bethlehem, Pennsylvania.

Schedule

References

Lehigh
Lehigh Mountain Hawks football seasons
Lehigh football